The Movie Show was a half-hour weekly Irish television series which served as RTÉ's flagship movie review show. First broadcast in 1993 until September 2001, it was presented by Dave Fanning, who was amongst the many people outraged when the show was axed. Movie companies were also said to be distressed at its axing. Fanning criticised RTÉ's management, who never once consulted with him before making their decision, and said the axing of the show was "ludicrous" and "outrageous". He implied that RTÉ ought to produce a programme that reviews movies as it is seen as cheap and the interviews are paid for by the movie companies themselves. Fanning insisted that it had been "a very cheap programme and we were always under budget".

The Movie Show was touted as returning in 2002.

The Movie Show was the working title of a new film review series for the 2012–13 season on RTÉ. The series ran for 16 episodes, each of 25 minutes duration.

2012 return
On Thursday 1 November 2012, the show returned to RTÉ Two at 9.00pm for 30 minutes and ran for 16 weeks. It was presented by Mairead Farrell and Eoghan McDermott with reporters Angela Scanlon, Rob Ross and Daniella Moyles. The first episode had interviews with Daniel Craig and Ross Noble and a review of Fun Size.

References

External links
Official web site of the 2012 show

1993 Irish television series debuts
2001 Irish television series endings
RTÉ original programming
Film criticism television series